Igbuku is a community in Ndokwa East Local Government Area of Delta State, Nigeria.  It is located on the shores of the River Ase.  Igbuku shares a common boundary with Ofagbe, Ovrode, Ibrede, Aboh, and Ashaka. The town is made up of descendants from Ndokwa speaking founders and have over time intertwined in intermarriages with Isoko neighbours, that almost everyone from the town can trace to a mixed ancestry. Most early founders were from Ellu, Ovrode, and Aradhe hence most people trace their ancestry to Ellu, Ovrode, and Aradhe. There are also migrants from Ellu, Ofagbe, Ibrede, and Aradhe. Ndokwa and Isoko languages are the main means of communication.

Igbuku Town is ruled by the Ozu, who is a recognized, gazetted traditional ruler in Nigeria. Igbuku's population is 3,500. The town has a primary school, post office, and a maternity/dispensary. The roads are passable by car with clear roads to Ibrede, and a new bridge to Aboh.

Populated places in Delta State